Lucrezia Stefanini won the title after Sinja Kraus retired in the final at 6–2, 2–1.

Beatriz Haddad Maia was the defending champion but chose to participate at the US Open instead.

Seeds

Draw

Finals

Top half

Bottom half

References

External Links
Main Draw

TCCB Open - Singles